Peter William Redgrove (2 January 1932 – 16 June 2003) was a British poet, who also wrote prose, novels and plays with his second wife Penelope Shuttle.

Life and career
Redgrove was born in Kingston upon Thames, Surrey. He was educated at Taunton School, and Queens' College, Cambridge. While at Cambridge he edited Delta magazine for several issues, and met the poets Ted Hughes and Harry Guest. He left in 1954 without taking a degree, married the sculptor Barbara Sherlock, and went into copywriting.

In Cambridge Redgrove participated in Philip Hobsbaum's poetry discussion group. He continued to participate when these discussions moved to London and was thus a member of 'The Group'. He taught at the University at Buffalo in 1961/2, and was Gregory Fellow at the University of Leeds from 1962 to 1965. He was awarded the Queen's Gold Medal for Poetry in 1996.

Redgrove had three children from his first marriage to the sculptor Barbara Redgrove, William, Peter and Katherine. He and his second wife, poet Penelope Shuttle, had a daughter, Zoe.

Works

Poetry collections
 
 
At The White Monument (1963), poems
 
 
 
  Introduced by D. M. Thomas (1969)
 
 
 
   Broadside.
  Broadsheet 15.
Love's Journeys (1971), poems
Doctor Faust's Sea-Spiral Spirit & Other Poems (1972), poems
 
Two Poems (1972)
Sons of My Skin: Selected Poems 1954–1974 (1975), edited by Marie Peel
From Every Chink of the Ark (1977), poems
Skull Event (1977)
Ten Poems (1977)
The Fortifiers, the Vitrifiers, and the Witches (1977)
Happiness (1978), poems
The White, Night-Flying Moths Called Souls (1978)
New Poetry 5: An Arts Council Anthology (1979), editor with Jon Silkin
The Weddings at Nether Powers (1979), poems
The First Earthquake (1980)
The Apple Broadcast and Other New Poems (1981)
The Facilitators, or Mister Hole-in-the–Day (1982)
Man Named East and other New Poems (1985)
The Explanation of the Two Visions (1985)
The Mudlark Poems & Grand Buveur (1986)
In the Hall of the Saurians (1987), shortlisted for the Whitbread Prize for Poetry in 1987
The Moon Disposes: Poems 1954—1987 (1987)
The One Who Set Out To Study Fear (1989)
Poems 1954–1987 (1989)
Dressed as for a Tarot Pack (1990), poems
Under the Reservoir (1992), poems
The Laborators (1993)
 
Abyssophone (1995)
Assembling a Ghost (1996), poems
The Book of Wonders: The Best of Peter Redgrove's Poetry (1996), edited by Jeremy Robinson
Orchard End (1997), poems
Selected Poems (1999)
From the Virgil Caverns (2002), poems
Sheen (2003)
Collected Poems (2012)

Novels
In the Country of the Skin (1973), novel
The Hermaphrodite Album (1973), with Penelope Shuttle
From the Reflections of Mr. Glass (1974)
A Romance, The Terror of Dr Treviles (1974), with Penelope Shuttle
Aesculapian Notes (1975)
The Glass Cottage (1976), fiction, with Penelope Shuttle
The Sleep of the Great Hypnotist: The Life and Death and Life After Death of a Modern Magician (1979), novel
The Beekeepers (1980), novel
The God of Glass: A Morality (1979)
The Working of Water (1984)

Plays
Miss Carstairs Dressed for Blooding & Other Plays (1977).

Short Stories collections
The Cyclopean Mistress: Selected Short Fiction 1960–1990 (1993)
What the Black Mirror Saw: New Short Fiction and Prose Poetry (1997)

As editor
Poet's Playground 1963 (1963), editor
Universities Poetry 7 (1965), editor
New Poems 1967 (1968), editor with John Fuller, Harold Pinter
Penguin Modern Poets 11 (1968), with D. M. Black and D. M. Thomas
Lamb and Thundercloud (1975), editor
Cornwall in Verse (1983), editor

Prose books
The Wise Wound – Menstruation & Everywoman (1978), with Penelope Shuttle
Alchemy for Women: Personal Transformation Through Dreams and the Female Cycle (1995), with Penelope Shuttle
The Black Goddess and the Sixth Sense (1987)

Translations 
Para el ojo que duerme (2006). Translator: Jordi Doce. Luis Burgos Arte del Siglo XX.

External links

"Peter Redgrove" (obituary). Daily Telegraph, 18 June 2003.
Margaret Drabble, "Redgrove, Peter William (1932–2003)". Oxford Dictionary of National Biography, online edn, January 2007. Retrieved 30 April 2007.
Redgrove papers at the Library of the University of Sheffield.
Review of Redgrove's Collected Poems in the Oxonian Review.
Redgrove's Radio Drama.
Archival Material at 
https://www.cairn.info/revue-etudes-anglaises-2013-4-page-470.htm#
Stuart A. Rose Manuscript, Archives, and Rare Book Library, Emory University: Letters to Peter Redgrove, circa 1966-1984

1932 births
2003 deaths
Alumni of Queens' College, Cambridge
People educated at Taunton School
People from Kingston upon Thames
English male poets
20th-century English poets
20th-century English male writers